Kan Khan-e Masumeh (also Romanized as Kan Khān-e Ma‘şūmeh; also known as Kankhvān-e Ma‘şūmābād) is a village in Mirbag-e Jonubi Rural District, in the Central District of Delfan County, Lorestan Province, Iran. At the 2006 census, its population was 116, in 18 families.

References 

Towns and villages in Delfan County